Orocrambus xanthogrammus is a moth in the family Crambidae. It was described by Edward Meyrick in 1883. It is endemic to New Zealand, where it has been recorded from the South Island and the eastern part of the North Island. The habitat of this species consists of shingle river beds.

The wingspan is 20–30 mm. Adults have been recorded on wing from December to March.

The larvae probably feed on Raoulia species.

References

Crambinae
Moths described in 1883
Taxa named by Edward Meyrick
Moths of New Zealand
Endemic fauna of New Zealand
Endemic moths of New Zealand